Ziesemer is a surname. Notable people with the surname include:

Edgar Ziesemer (1895–1971), German cinematographer
Friedrich Wilhelm Ernst Ziesemer (1897–1972), Australian farmer
Theodor Martin Peter Ziesemer (1899–1961), Australian farmer

See also
Ziesmer